The Wofford Terriers are the athletic teams that represent the Wofford College, located in Spartanburg, South Carolina, in intercollegiate sports at the Division I level of the National Collegiate Athletic Association (NCAA), primarily competing in the Southern Conference since the 1997–98 academic year. Wofford and the other SoCon members play football in the Football Championship Subdivision. Prior to the 1995–96 year, the Terriers played in Division II in all sports, and until the 1988–89 period, Wofford's athletic teams were members of the NAIA. The football team plays in Gibbs Stadium. The basketball teams moved to the new Jerry Richardson Indoor Stadium for the 2017–18 season.

The Wofford campus is also the site of the training camp of the NFL's Carolina Panthers, whose former owner, Jerry Richardson, is a Wofford alumnus.

Teams 
A member of the Southern Conference, Wofford College sponsors teams in nine men's, eight women's, and one coed NCAA sanctioned sports:

Men's basketball 
Wofford Terriers Men's Basketball competes in the Southern Conference. They have won 4 regular season SoCon Titles and 5 SoCon Tournament Championships and 1 SoCon Tournament Runner-Up. The Terriers currently hold a 1–5 record in the NCAA Tournament.  Wofford has defeated various high major opponents during their 27 years in D1. They have beaten North Carolina twice, South Carolina twice, Georgia twice, Clemson, Georgia Tech, NC State, Seton Hall, Purdue, Tulane, Wake Forest, Cincinnati, Auburn, Virginia Tech, Air Force, George Mason, and Xavier since joining D1 for the 1995–96 season.

On March 8, 2010, the Wofford Terriers men's basketball team defeated Appalachian State to win the Southern Conference tournament, marking the first time Wofford qualified to compete in the NCAA tournament.  Although Wofford came within a possession of upsetting 4th seeded Wisconsin in the first round, they eventually lost 49–53.  The Terriers qualified for the NCAA tournament for the second time on March 7, 2011, winning the Southern Conference tournament over College of Charleston, 77–67, but they lost in the first round to BYU. Brad Loesing, point guard and 4.0 Phi Beta Kappa student, was selected first team Division 1 All-American.  In 2013, Wofford won the Southern Conference tournament and qualified for the NCAA tournament for the third time in five years, losing to Michigan in the second round.  Wofford also won a spot in the 2015 NCAA tourney, going 28–6. In February 2016, Wofford set an NCAA record when it hit 17 of 21 shots from the three-point line against VMI.  For the 2017 season, a new state-of-the-art basketball and volleyball arena, Jerry Richardson Indoor Stadium, will open on the Wofford campus. In the 2017 season, Wofford defeated the defending national champion North Carolina Tar Heels in Chapel Hill, the first Wofford win against a ranked opponent & the first win against a Top 5 opponent in School history.  

During the 2018–19 season, Wofford was nationally ranked for the first time in school history. The Terriers finished with a 30–5 record and 18–0 in the Southern Conference, the first undefeated SoCon season in the modern era. As a 7-seed in the NCAA Tournament, they defeated 10th seeded Seton Hall 84–68 in the first round, and during the game Wofford star Shooting Guard Fletcher Magee broke the NCAA record for All-Time Career Three Pointers made. They went on to lose to Kentucky 62–56 in the second round of the NCAA tournament in a contest that garnered the 2nd Highest Ratings of any game during the Round of 32. Fletcher went on to win the 2019 Lou Henson Award, an award given annually by CollegeInsider.com to the most outstanding mid-major men's college basketball player in NCAA Division I competition. They spent the final 5 weeks in the AP Top 25 poll, finishing in the Final AP Top 25 at #18. Following the season, legendary Wofford Basketball Coach Mike Young was hired as the new Head Coach at Virginia Tech, with Jay McAuley taking over as Wofford Head Coach.

During the 2019–2020 season, Wofford beat the 17th ranked North Carolina Tar Heels again in Chapel Hill for the second time in 3 years. They finished 7th in the Southern Conference during the regular season, but made a run in the Southern Conference Tourney with its second appearance in the SoCon title game in as many years before Wofford lost to ETSU in the finals. The following season, 2020–21, the season was significantly shortened due to COVID-19 and no fans were allowed to attend games. Wofford finished Second in the SoCon during the regular season, a half game back of UNC-G. This sparked controversy as Wofford held the head-to-head advantage with UNC-G, and Wofford was not allowed to make-up a game with Samford which had been delayed and later cancelled. As a two seed in the SoCon Tournament, Wofford was upset by 7th seed Mercer, losing 62–61.

Gallery

References

External links